|- style="vertical-align: top;"
| Distance 
| 170,000 ly 

PSR J0537-6910 is a pulsar that is 4,000 years old (not including the light travel time to Earth). It is located about 170,000 light-years away, in the southern constellation of Dorado, and is located in the Large Magellanic Cloud. It rotates at 62 hertz.

Astronomer John Middleditch and his team at LANL have become the first people to predict starquakes; and observe magnetic pole drift on a pulsar; using this pulsar with observational data from Rossi X-ray Timing Explorer.

External links
 Scientists Can Predict Pulsar Starquakes (SpaceDaily) Jun 07, 2006
 Astronomers predict timing of starquakes Maggie McKee (New Scientist) 15:54 6 June 2006
 SIMBAD entry for PSR J0537-6910

See also
 Supernova
 LHA 120-N 157B

Stars in the Large Magellanic Cloud
Dorado (constellation)
Pulsars